The Price of Greed (Traditional Chinese: 千謊百計) is a TVB period drama series released overseas in December 2006 and aired on TVB Pay Vision Channel in January 2008.

Synopsis
When Lui To (Bosco Wong) was just a child, he and another girl, Yan Yuet-Mui (Shirley Yeung), were kidnapped on the same day by an organization which captured children in order to sell and exploit them for labour. Lui To and Yan Yuet-Mui were able to escape with the help of Lo Sei Leung (Kingdom Yuen), a woman who worked for the organization but had wanted to leave for a long time.

On the run from the organization, the three become a family of sorts and live day to day on the money earned from Lo Sei-Leung's cons, much to the displeasure of Lui To. Lui To's adamantly honest ways and naive sense of justice gets the better of them when Yan Yuet-Mui ends up with a fever; since Lui To had given the last of their money to a beggar, they accept medicine from a seedy medicine seller which leaves Yan Yuet-Mui mute.

Many years later, Lui To becomes a police officer while Yan Yuet-Mui attends school and plays the violin. Lui To falls in love with a wealthy girl, Lam Ping (Kate Tsui), but is disappointed to discover she is in love with Tsui Fung (Sammul Chan), a con artist.  He is unaware that Yan Yuet Mui has a crush on him, seeing her only as a younger sister.  In order to protect Lam Ping, Lui To investigates Tsui Fung and discovers his dark past. Though he is unable to stop Lam Ping from marrying Tsui Fung, he must try and save her from becoming another victim of Tsui Fung's cons.

Cast

External links
TVB.com The Price of Greed - Official Website 
K for TVB.net The Price of Greed - Episodic Synopsis and Screen Captures 
SPCNET.tv The Price of Greed - Reviews 

TVB dramas
2006 Hong Kong television series debuts
2006 Hong Kong television series endings
2008 Hong Kong television series debuts
2008 Hong Kong television series endings